Khan-Khokhi Khyargas Mountain National Park (also "Khan Khukhii") covers a western extension of the Khangai Mountains in Uvs Province.  The mountains separate the Uvs Depression to the north from the Khyargas Lake depression to the south.  Khan Khuckii is one of the "10 Sacred Mountains of Mongolia".  The site features ancient burial mounds.

Topography
The Khan-Khukhii National Park is a separate territory from that of Khyargas Nuur National Park, which is 20 km to the south. The mountain tops tend to be flat, and the slopes steep. The landscape was partially formed by glaciation.

Climate and ecoregion
The climate of the area is Cold semi-arid climate (Köppen climate classification (BSk)). This climate is characteristic of steppe climates intermediary between desert humid climates, and typically have precipitation is above evapotranspiration.  At least one month averages below .

Flora and fauna
The northern slopes of the Khan Khukhii Mountains receive more precipitation (300 mm/year) than the southern slopes (150 mm/year).   The north therefore supports greater variety in vertical zones - from steppe to mountain forest (Siberian larch and Siberian pine) to alpine meadows.  The southern slopes have desert and semi-arid desert vegetation.

See also
 List of national parks of Mongolia

References

External links
 Park borders, Khan Khukhii kharyas National Park, ProtectedPlanet.net

National parks of Mongolia
Uvs Province
Protected areas established in 2000
2000 establishments in Mongolia